Vidocq (North American DVD title: Dark Portals: The Chronicles of Vidocq) is a 2001 mystery film, directed by Pitof, starring Gérard Depardieu as historical figure Eugène François Vidocq pursuing a supernatural serial killer.

It is notable as being the first major fantasy film to be released that was shot entirely with digital cinematography, using a Sony HDW-F900 CineAlta camera.

The Finnish cello metal band Apocalyptica used clips from the film in the music video for their Cult track, "Hope Vol. 2" with Matthias Sayer of Farmer Boys providing extra recorded vocals, which served as the film's ending theme.

Plot
In 1830 Paris, private investigator Eugène Vidocq pursues a strange man who is wearing a cowl and a mirrored mask. The man lures Vidocq into a furnace room at a glass factory, and after a long fight, pushes him into the furnace. Hanging onto the ledge, Vidocq asks him to reveal his face. The masked man obliges, and Vidocq lets go, falling into the fire.

Journalist Étienne Boisset goes to Vidocq's colleague, René Nimier, asking for background to help write Vidocq's biography. Boisset states that he plans to find Vidocq's murderer. Nimier tells him that Lautrennes, Paris' chief of police, asked the pair to investigate the deaths of Belmont and Veraldi, the owners of a cannon factory. Lautrennes believes this is an attempt to undermine the French military in an unstable political climate. Belmont and Veraldi had died in a lightning strike, but during the investigation, Vidocq and Nimier see the powder on a factory worker's clothes catch fire. They interrogate the servant responsible for maintaining Belmont's and Veraldi's suits, who confesses that he received a letter, with cash, ordering him not to clean their jackets. The investigators realize that the lightning would need to be attracted to the men and find metallic pins, decorated with monkey heads, inserted into their hats.

Lautrennes orders one of his men, Tauzet, to investigate Vidocq's death. For his part, Boisset sneaks into Nimier's office and retrieves the monkey-head pins. He traces the design to Preah, a dancer in a brothel, and Vidocq's lover. She tells him that Vidocq also tracked her down, and that she told Vidocq that she received a letter, with cash, asking her to put the pins in the hats. She also reveals that the letter included a third targetErnest Lafitte, owner of an orphanage. Preah says that Vidocq rushed to save Lafitte, but the masked murderer got there first. Vidocq pursued the murderer, who seemed to possess magical powers and a mask made from a strange reflective surface.

Boisset's investigation leads him to Sylvia, the brothel manager, a journalist named Froissard who is investigating the masked murderer, and Marine Lafitte, wife of Ernest. They reveal that Lafitte, Belmont and Veraldi were narcissists, committed to preventing death by aging. A man with a mirror mask, called the Alchemist, offered them an elixir of eternal youth in return for their cooperation in capturing young maidens for his experiments. The three rich men went along, but later stopped cooperating due to a sense of guilt, so the Alchemist killed them. After Boisset leaves, the Alchemist arrives, killing Froissard and Marine. Boisset's investigation attracts the attention of Tauzet, who notices that the Alchemist is disposing of witnesses, and fears Boisset is next.

Boisset sneaks in to retrieve Vidocq's notes, where he encounters Lautrennes and Tauzet. Lautrennes attempts to arrest Boisset, but the journalist escapes. The notes reveal that Vidocq found the Alchemist's lab, where he was using the maidens' blood to create a magic substance for his mask, which grants eternal youth by sucking the souls out of his victims. The Alchemist arrived and attacked Vidocq, who managed to take a piece from the Alchemist's mask before the killer escaped. Vidocq's final note states that the Alchemist would need someone to manufacture the mirrored mask, leading him to the glass factory.

Boisset, Nimier and Preah head to the factory, ushered by an artisan, and closely trailed by both Tauzet and Lautrennes. Just as Boisset declares there are no more leads and witnesses, the artisan removes his prosthetic, revealing himself to be Vidocq. It turns out Vidocq had jumped into a secret hole in the furnace wall, which he saw in the reflection of the mirror mask before the Alchemist's reveal to be Boisset himself. Vidocq then admits to faking his own death simply to let Boisset's guard down, as he knows the Alchemist would destroy all clues and witnesses through any means necessary.

With his cover blown, Boisset lets out a monstrous roar and dons the Alchemist's mirror mask. Nimier opens fire, but is killed as the Alchemist magically reflects the bullets back at him. Vidocq pursues the Alchemist into a hall of mirrors, where he forces the Alchemist to look into a mirror shard, freeing all the souls trapped inside the mask. Vidocq impales the Alchemist with a shard of mirror and throws him into a river. Although the others insist the Alchemist is dead, Vidocq is unnerved by the lack of a body.

At Nimier's funeral, as the characters walk away, the Alchemist's laugh can be heard in the distance, accompanied by the glimmer of his mirror mask.

Cast
Gérard Depardieu as Vidocq
Guillaume Canet as Étienne Boisset
Inés Sastre as Préah
André Dussollier as Lautrennes
Édith Scob as Sylvia
Isabelle Renauld as Marine Lafitte
Moussa Maaskri as Nimier
Jean-Pierre Gos as Tauzet
Jean-Pol Dubois as Belmont
André Penvern as Veraldi
Gilles Arbona as Lafitte
Jean-Marc Thibault as Leviner
François Chattot as Froissard

Production

Post production
The film featured 800 shots modified in post-production over a period of eight months, at a cost of over €20 million. It was the first feature film to be shot in digital progressive HDTV at 24 fps cinematic framerate (1080p24), one year before Star Wars: Episode II – Attack of the Clones. A few short scenes, however, were shot using DV format (576i25) for artistic purposes. Only those special effects shots were deinterlaced by means of smart field blending (imitating a progressive-type amount of motion blur due to a different shutter speed of progressive modes) during post-production, as the special effects crew obviously was in demand of progressive frames which are easier to process. Normal shots were in no need of deinterlacing, thanks to progressive scan HD cameras. The result are video-like appearance of motions in DV shots, due to the different amount of motion blur resulting from the different deinterlacing methods, and distinctive film-like motions for the dominant 1080p24 shots otherwise.

See also
Vidocq (1939)
A Scandal in Paris (1946)
The Emperor of Paris (2018)

References

External links
 
 
 

2001 films
French detective films
2000s French-language films
Romantic period films
Films set in the 1830s
Films set in Paris
French science fiction films
2001 directorial debut films
French alternate history films
Supernatural thriller films
Occult detective fiction
Cultural depictions of Eugène François Vidocq
Films directed by Pitof
Films scored by Bruno Coulais
2000s French films